Festucalex is a genus of fish in the family Syngnathidae native to the Indian and Pacific Ocean.

Species
There are currently 11 recognized species in this genus:
 Festucalex amakusensis (Tomiyama, 1972)
 Festucalex armillatus Prokofiev, 2016 
 Festucalex cinctus (E. P. Ramsay, 1882) (Girdled pipefish)
 Festucalex erythraeus (C. H. Gilbert, 1905)
 Festucalex gibbsi C. E. Dawson, 1977 (Gibbs' pipefish)
 Festucalex kulbickii R. Fricke, 2004 (Kulbicki's pipefish)
 Festucalex prolixus C. E. Dawson, 1984
 Festucalex rufus G. R. Allen & Erdmann, 2015 (Pink pipefish)  
 Festucalex scalaris (Günther, 1870) (Ladder pipefish)
 Festucalex townsendi (Duncker, 1915) 
 Festucalex wassi C. E. Dawson, 1977 (Wass' pipefish)

References

 
Marine fish genera
Taxa named by Gilbert Percy Whitley